The Takwa settlement is situated on  the south side of Manda Island, in the Lamu District in the coastal province of Kenya. They are the ruins of a  town which was abandoned around the 18th century.

The Takwa site can be easily reached from Lamu town. The ruins  were first excavated by James Kirkman in 1951. In 1972 the site was cleared again under the supervision of James de Vere Allen, the Curator of the Lamu Museum.

Takwa was never a large place. It was founded around 1500, and probably abandoned around 1700. Kirkman thought that it was perhaps a place where holy men or religious people retreated. The Great Mosque at Takwa is relatively well preserved. The other structure of importance is the Pillar Tomb, which has an inscription with the date of 1681–1682.
It is reported that when Takwa was abandoned, its inhabitants settled just across the bay at Shela on Lamu Island. Twice a year the people of Shela come to the Pillar Tomb in Takwa to pray  for rain.  The Takwa Ruins were designated a Kenyan National Monument in 1982.

Gallery

See also
Historic Swahili Settlements
Swahili architecture

References

Bibliography

Martin, Chryssee MacCasler Perry and Esmond Bradley Martin:  Quest for the Past. An historical guide to the Lamu Archipelago. 1973.

Further reading
Wilson, Thomas H.: Takwa: An Ancient Swahili Settlement of the Lamu Archipelago.  Kenya Museum Society.

Swahili people
Swahili city-states
Swahili architecture
Archaeological sites in Kenya
Populated places in Coast Province
Former populated places in Kenya
Archaeological sites of Eastern Africa